My Father Knew Charles Ives is an orchestral triptych by the American composer John Adams.  The work was commissioned by the San Francisco Symphony.  It was first performed by the San Francisco Symphony under the direction of Michael Tilson Thomas at the Louise M. Davies Symphony Hall on April 30, 2003.

Composition

Background
John Adams composed My Father Knew Charles Ives in 2003 as a musical autobiography and as a homage to the early 20th-century American composer Charles Ives, who has been one of Adams's major musical influences.  Adams's father Carl Adams did not actually know Charles Ives, but the composer observed many similarities between the two men's lives, and between their lives and his own.  In the score program notes, Adams wrote:

He continued:

The title, Adams observed, may have been unconsciously influenced by Morton Feldman's 1971 chamber piece I Met Heine on the Rue Fürstenberg.  The music also contains quotes from "Reveille" and the hymn "Nearer, My God, to Thee" in addition to many stylistic references to the music of Ives.

Structure
The piece has a duration of approximately 28 minutes and is cast in three movements:

The three movements reflect meaningful places in Adams's life. The first movement is a reference to Concord, New Hampshire of Adams's early life, though it doubles as a nod to Concord, Massachusetts of Ives's titular Concord Sonata. "The Lake" refers to the waters near Mount Washington where Adams's parents first met. "The Mountain" refers to Mount Kearsarge, Mount Shasta, and the Sierra Nevada mountains of the West Coast.

Instrumentation
The work is scored for an orchestra consisting of the following instruments.

Woodwinds
piccolo
3 flutes (3rd doubling piccolo)
2 oboes
 English horn
3 clarinets (3rd doubling E clarinet)
 bass clarinet
2 bassoons
 contrabassoon

Brass
4 horns
4 trumpets
3 trombones
 tuba

Percussion
timpani, doubling 2 temple bowls
4 percussionists, playing:

celeste
piano

Strings
harp

violin I
violin II
viola 
cello
double basses

Reception
My Father Knew Charles Ives has been praised by music critics.  Reviewing the world premiere, Joshua Kosman of the San Francisco Chronicle wrote, "My Father Knew Charles Ives, a funny, rueful and heartbreakingly beautiful musical memoir, melds Adams' personal history with that of American concert music in one easy and daring artistic stroke..."  He added, "This is a capacious and detailed 30-minute orchestral essay by our nation's most important composer working at the height of his creative powers."  Kosman later wrote, "What an amazing tour de force it is! Full of exuberant humor and tender reverie, written with an unparalleled mastery of orchestral texture and instrumental color, it solidifies Adams' claim as the most important American composer of his generation."  Mark Swed of the Los Angeles Times similarly described it as a "deeply affectionate new score," but also noted, "My Father Knew Charles Ives makes an effort to retain that optimism, and it seems that the only way Adams can now do this is through nostalgia, for his childhood, his musical heritage, his own earlier work. The result is still oddly melancholic. Diverting as it is, the new work, in its referrals to Ives, seems to suggest that there is less optimism to be found in what we are today than in what we once were."  The music was also lauded by Anthony Tommasini of The New York Times, who remarked, "Though at times the score seemed structurally amorphous, moment to moment the music was riveting."

Reviewing a recording of the piece, Philip Clark of Gramophone was somewhat more critical, observing, "It's difficult to say what exactly Adams has created. It falls somewhere between direct quotation and constructivist allusion, like hearing deconstructed 'picture postcard' Ives. It's fun for sure, and the BBC Symphony Orchestra relishes its follies."  Andrew Clements of The Guardian similarly described the triptych as "wonderfully crafted, if sometimes coming close to pastiche."

Recording
A recording of My Father Knew Charles Ives, performed by the BBC Symphony Orchestra under the direction of Adams, was released through Nonesuch Records on September 26, 2006.  The album also features Adams's electric violin concerto The Dharma at Big Sur.

References

Compositions by John Adams (composer)
2003 compositions
Compositions for symphony orchestra
Music commissioned by the San Francisco Symphony